Thalit was a small hamlet in Algeria, all but one of whose 53 inhabitants were killed in 1997 in the Thalit massacre.

Populated places in Médéa Province